Christopher Drew Carter (born September 5, 1981) is a former American football wide receiver of the National Football League. He was originally drafted by the Carolina Panthers in the fifth round of the 2004 NFL Draft. He played college football at Ohio State.

He also played for the Oakland Raiders.

Early years
At Solon High School, Carter tallied 33 receptions for 890 yards and thirteen touchdowns as a senior in his first season of football. He registered three touchdown catches in his football debut.

College career
Drew Carter attended Ohio State University. Carter's college career was marred by several injuries to his knees and ankles. He produced 41 catches for 632 yards and one touchdown during his college career.

Professional career

Carolina Panthers
Carter spent his rookie season in 2004 on injured reserve after tearing his ACL during June coaching sessions. He missed additional time throughout his career with injuries to his ankle. He made the team roster midway through the 2005 NFL season after the team released Rod Gardner, and taking his first catch 44 yards to set up a Panthers score. In the Panthers' three post-season games that season, he had 4 receptions for 131 yards and a touchdown, a franchise record for most yards per catch in a single postseason (32.75). In 2007 Carter had his most productive NFL regular season, making 38 catches for 517 yards and 4 touchdowns, all of which were among the team's top three performances.

Oakland Raiders
On March 12, 2008, he signed with the Oakland Raiders as a free agent.

On Saturday August 23, 2008 Carter suffered a season-ending injury when he tore the ACL in his left knee during the Oakland Raiders third preseason game versus the Arizona Cardinals. He was placed on injured reserve on August 25.

External links
Carolina Panthers bio
Oakland Raiders bio
Drew Carter's gotcast.com page
Metal Noir

1981 births
Living people
Players of American football from Ohio
People from Solon, Ohio
American football wide receivers
Ohio State Buckeyes football players
Carolina Panthers players
Oakland Raiders players
Sportspeople from Cuyahoga County, Ohio